Weismann-Netter–Stuhl syndrome, also known as Weismann-Netter syndrome or tibioperoneal diaphyseal toxopachyosteosis, is a rare disorder characterized by bowing of the lower legs and an abnormal thickening of thinner bone in the leg.

The main sign is anterior bowing and posterior cortical thickening of the diaphyses of both the tibiae and fibulae. It is thought to be inherited in an autosomal dominant fashion and is most often bilateral and symmetric in nature. Associated features include dwarfism and mild intellectual disability as well as a process known as tibialization of the fibulae, which involves thickening and enlargement of these bones to an extent resembling the tibiae. The combination of the presence of tibialization of the fibulae, which is highly specific for the disorder, and the absence of laboratory abnormalities, ruling out alternative diagnoses including rickets, essentially confirms the diagnosis.

Cause
This condition is currently felt to be a genetic disorder, caused by inheritance of an abnormal gene via autosomal dominant inheritance.

Diagnosis

Radiographic features 
The most prominent and extensively documented findings of Weismann-Netter–Stuhl syndrome are on plain radiographs of the bones. Findings include bilateral and symmetric anterior bowing of both tibiae and fibulae, lateral bowing of the tibiae, femoral bowing, and squaring of iliac and pelvis bones.

Management
Gene therapy if possible

History 

The features of this disorder were first described by French doctors Robert Weismann-Netter (1894–1980) and L. Stuhl in their report first describing the association in seven patients in 1954. They believed these seven patients had mistakenly been diagnosed as congenital syphilis or rickets, which remain the primary considerations in the differential diagnosis of this syndrome today.

References

External links 

Osteopathies
Rare syndromes